Heat shock factor protein 2 is a protein that in humans is encoded by the HSF2 gene.

Function 

HSF2, as well as the related gene HSF1, encodes a protein that binds specifically to the heat-shock element and has homology to HSFs of other species. Heat shock transcription factors activate heat-shock response genes under conditions of heat or other stresses. Although the names HSF1 and HSF2 were chosen for historical reasons, these peptides should be referred to as heat-shock transcription factors.

Interactions 

HSF2 has been shown to interact with Nucleoporin 62 and HSF1.

See also 
 Heat shock factor

References

Further reading

External links 
 

Transcription factors